John Gagliardi, is an Australian journalist, businessman, author and lobbyist.

Career
Gagliardi was the founding Chairman of the Board of Directors of the Christian Outreach Centre's Christian Heritage College in Brisbane, Queensland, established in 1986.

During his media career, Galiardi was the editor of the Townsville Bulletin; Chief of Staff of National Nine TV News in Brisbane and Assistant Features Editor of The Telegraph which was for many years Brisbane's afternoon tabloid.

In 1995 he was one of the founders of the Australian Christian Lobby, then known as the Australian Christian Coalition.

Gagliardi is currently the Director of Development at the Haggai Institute, Australia.

Works
Book
  The Marketplace - Our Mission

Devotional materials
 Gagliardi has produced a series of devotional materials for the City Harvest Church Singapore, entitled Breakthrough Word.

See also
 Australian Christian Lobby (ACL)
 Jim Wallace
 Lyle Shelton
 Wendy Francis

External links
 National Others Week - John Gagliardi

References

Living people
Australian anti-abortion activists
University of Queensland alumni
Year of birth missing (living people)